Dioptis charon is a moth of the family Notodontidae first described by Herbert Druce in 1893. It is found in Bolivia and the lowlands of south-eastern Peru.

Adults have a wide white transverse forewing band and an ochreous-orange submarginal hindwing band.

References

Moths described in 1893
Notodontidae of South America